Un Mexicano en la México ("A Mexican in the México") is the title of a live album and DVD released by the Mexican performer Vicente Fernández on October 5, 2010.

Track listing

Sales and certifications

References

External links
 Official website Vicente Fernández
 [ Un Mexicano en la México on allmusic.com]
 Un Mexicano en la México on .apple.com

Live video albums
2010 live albums
Vicente Fernández live albums
Spanish-language live albums
Sony BMG Norte live albums